Red Burns is the second album by the American experimental collective Standing on the Corner. It was released on September 11, 2017.

The album features collaborations with their friends and the local New York creative community including MIKE, sLUms, EMC, Lila Ramani from Crumb.

Release
Red Burns was released through their official website on September 11, tying the album and the imagery to the duos connection to New York. Even though their previous album had also been released on the same date the previous year, they revealed that had happened by chance. Escobar detailed the importance of that date and being a New Yorker and the contrast of the sense of vulnerability in a city that otherwise has a very confident character. "As much as you love this place, it's very unforgiving and harsh. It's not easy. There are worse places to be, granted. I think [using the imagery of] the towers, that's the perfect way of saying that without saying that."

Critical reception

Red Burns received acclaim for its genre-bending freeform music and what it manages to capture in an audio-scrapbook manner. Many critics citing the project's ability to capture their essence of New York City. For example, Sheldon Pearce of Pitchfork wrote "Red Burns is a dazzling sensory experience, a city tour in which each track is like a street sign...and Red Burns seems designed as a sort of multidimensional diagram of New York City, the diverse perspectives it shapes, and the varying journeys inside its city blocks." Matthew Strauss described it as "hour-long, uninterrupted piece" that "blends elements of jazz, indie rock, soul, funk, and hip-hop, tossing in poetry, mock radio broadcasts, a lot of samples, and plenty of distortion."

Pitchfork included the music video for “SahBabii /\ Now, Nation End, 38:15” on their list of The Best Music Videos of 2018.

Track listing

References 

Free jazz albums
Alternative hip hop albums by American artists
2017 albums
Neo soul albums
Sound collage albums